José Canals (10 October 1914 – 5 August 1937) was a Spanish cross-country skier. He competed in the men's 18 kilometre event at the 1936 Winter Olympics. He was killed during the Spanish Civil War.

References

1914 births
1937 deaths
Spanish male cross-country skiers
Olympic cross-country skiers of Spain
Cross-country skiers at the 1936 Winter Olympics
Sportspeople from Barcelona
Military personnel killed in the Spanish Civil War
Olympians killed in warfare